{
	"type": "FeatureCollection",
	"features": [
		{
			"type": "Feature",
			"properties": { "marker-symbol": "circle", "marker-color": "000080", "title": "Bhinmal" },
			"geometry": { "type": "Point", "marker-color": "808080", "coordinates": [72.25, 25.0] }
		},
		{
			"type": "Feature",
			"properties": { "marker-symbol": "circle", "marker-color": "000080", "title": "Mandore" },
			"geometry": { "type": "Point", "marker-color": "808080", "coordinates": [73.0331, 26.3535] }
		},
		{
			"type": "Feature",
			"properties": { "marker-symbol": "circle", "marker-color": "000080", "title": "Jalore" },
			"geometry": { "type": "Point", "marker-color": "808080", "coordinates": [72.62, 25.35] }
		},
		{
			"type": "Feature",
			"properties": { "marker-symbol": "circle", "marker-color": "000080", "title": "Patan" },
			"geometry": { "type": "Point", "marker-color": "808080", "coordinates": [72.125, 23.85] }
		},
		{
			"type": "Feature",
			"properties": { "marker-symbol": "circle", "marker-color": "000080", "title": "Didwana" },
			"geometry": { "type": "Point", "marker-color": "808080", "coordinates": [74.57, 27.4] }
		},
		{
			"type": "Feature",
			"properties": { "marker-symbol": "circle", "marker-color": "000080", "title": "Rajore (Rajorgarh)" },
			"geometry": { "type": "Point", "marker-color": "808080", "coordinates": [76.622, 27.236] }
		},
		{
			"type": "Feature",
			"properties": { "marker-symbol": "circle", "marker-color": "000080", "title": "Bayana" },
			"geometry": { "type": "Point", "marker-color": "808080", "coordinates": [77.28, 26.9] }
		},
		{
			"type": "Feature",
			"properties": { "marker-symbol": "triangle", "marker-color": "808080", "title": "Sindh" },
			"geometry": { "type": "Point", "marker-color": "808080", "coordinates": [68.9833, 27.65] }
		},
		{
			"type": "Feature",
			"properties": { "marker-symbol": "triangle", "marker-color": "808080", "title": "Bharuch" },
			"geometry": { "type": "Point", "marker-color": "808080", "coordinates": [72.993, 21.712] }
		},
		{
			"type": "Feature",
			"properties": { "marker-symbol": "triangle", "marker-color": "808080", "title": "Ujjain" },
			"geometry": { "type": "Point", "marker-color": "808080", "coordinates": [75.79, 23.17] }
		},
		{
			"type": "Feature",
			"properties": { "marker-symbol": "triangle", "marker-color": "808080", "title": "Valabhi" },
			"geometry": { "type": "Point", "marker-color": "808080", "coordinates": [71.8795, 21.8878] }
		},
		{
			"type": "Feature",
			"properties": { "marker-symbol": "triangle", "marker-color": "808080", "title": "Kannauj" },
			"geometry": { "type": "Point", "marker-color": "808080", "coordinates": [79.92, 27.07] }
		}
	]
}
Gurjaradesa ("Gurjara country") or Gurjaratra is a historical region in India comprising the eastern Rajasthan and northern Gujarat during the period of 6th -12th century CE. The predominant power of the region, the Gurjara-Pratiharas eventually controlled a major part of North India centered at Kannauj. The modern state of "Gujarat" derives its name from the ancient Gurjaratra.

Early references to Gurjara country 

Gurjaradēśa, or Gurjara country, is first attested in Bana's Harshacharita (7th century CE). Its king is said to have been subdued by Harsha's father Prabhakaravardhana (died c. 605 CE). The bracketing of the country with Sindha (Sindh), Lāta (southern Gujarat) and Malava (western Malwa) indicates that the region including the northern Gujarat and Rajasthan is meant.

Hieun Tsang, the Chinese Buddhist pilgrim who visited India between 631-645 CE during Harsha's reign, mentioned the Gurjara country (Kiu-che-lo) with its capital at Bhinmal (Pi-lo-mo-lo) as the second largest kingdom of Western India. He distinguished it from the neighbouring kingdoms of Bharukaccha (Bharuch), Ujjayini (Ujjain), Malava (Malwa), Valabhi and Surashtra.  The Gurjara kingdom was said to have measured 833 miles in circuit and its ruler was a 20-year old kshatriya, who was distinguished for his wisdom and courage. It is known that, in 628 CE, the kingdom at Bhinmal was ruled by a Chapa dynasty ruler Vyāgrahamukha, under whose reign the mathematician-astronomer Brahmagupta wrote his famous treatise. It is believed that the young ruler mentioned by Hieun Tsang must have been his immediate successor.
It appears that the Gurjara country at that time comprised modern Rajasthan. Following the death of Harsha, his empire split up into small kingdoms. Gurjaradesa is believed to have become independent.

The Arab chroniclers of Sindh (an Arab province from 712 CE onward), narrated the campaigns of Arab governors on Jurz, the Arabic term for Gurjara. They mentioned it jointly with Mermad (Marumāda, in Western Rajasthan) and Al Baylaman (Bhinmal). The country was first conquered by Mohammad bin Qasim (712-715) and, for a second time, by Junayd (723-726). Upon bin Qasim's victory, Al-Baladhuri mentioned that the Indian rulers, including that of Bhinmal, accepted Islam and paid tribute. They presumably recanted after bin Qasim's departure, which made Junayd's attack necessary. After Junayd's reconquest, the kingdom at Bhinmal appears to have been annexed by the Arabs.

Successor Gurjara kingdoms 

A Gurjara kingdom was founded by Harichandra Rohilladhi at Mandore (Mandavyapura) in about 600 CE. This is expected to have been a small kingdom. His descendant, Nagabhata, shifted the capital to Merta (Medāntakapura) in about 680 CE. Eventually, this dynasty adopted the designation of "Pratihara" in line with the Imperial Pratiharas, to whom it became feudatory. They are often referred to as Mandore Pratiharas by historians.

The Bharuch line of Gurjaras (Gurjaras of Lata) was founded by Dadda I, who is identified with Harichandra's youngest son of the same name by many historians. These Gurjaras were always recognized as vassals (sāmanthas) though their allegiance might have varied over time. They are believed to have wrested a fair portion of the Lata province of the Chaulukyas and their kingdom also came to be regarded as part of Gurjaradesa.

A final line of Gurjaras was founded by Nagabhata I at Jalore, in the vicinity of Bhinmal, in about 730 CE, soon after Junayd's end of term in Sindh.  Nagabhata is said to have defeated the "invincible Gurjaras," presumably those of Bhinmal. Another account credits him for having defeated a "Muslim ruler." Nagabhata is also known to have repelled the Arabs during a later raid. His dynasty later expanded to Ujjain and called itself Pratihara. The rival kingdoms of Pratiharas, the Rashtrakutas and Palas, however continued to call them Gurjaras or kings of Gurjaras (Gurjaresa).  The Pratiharas became the dominant force of the entire Rajasthan and Gujarat regions, establishing a powerful empire centered at Kannauj, the former capital of Harshavardhana.

Later references 
Udyotana Suri's Kuvalayamala composed in Jalore in 778 CE describes  in detail the Gurjara country as a beautiful country, whose residents are also referred to as Gurjaras. They were differentiated from the Saindhavas (people of Sindh), Latas (in southern Gujarat), Malavas (people of Malwa) and Meravas. They were mentioned to be devotees of dharma and clever in matters of peace as well as war.

The term Gurjaratra is first mentioned in the Ghatiyala inscription of Kakkuka (Mandore Pratihara) in 861 CE. Kakkuka is said to have won the love of the people of Gurjaratra along with those Marumada, Valla and Travani. Later records suggest that this Gurjaratra mandala was in the region of Didwana in the old Jodhpur State.

In later times, the term Gurjaratra is used to connote the present day Gujarat. Jinadatta Suri (1075-1154 CE) mentions a country of Gujaratta with its capital at Anahilapataka (Patan) in northern Gujarat.  The Chaulukyas (Solankis) are also referred to as Gurjaras in inscriptions and their country as Gurjaradesa.

Culture and science 
Bhinmal was a great centre of learning. According to Kanhadade Prabandha, it had 45,000 Brahmins who never tired of studying the ancient sacred books.

Brahmagupta, the well-known mathematicians astronomer, was born in 598 CE in Bhinmal. He is likely to have lived most of his life in the town, during the empire of Harsha.  He wrote two texts on mathematics and astronomy: The Brahma Sphuta Siddhanta in 628, and the Khandakhadyaka in 665. He made seminal contributions to mathematics, including the first mathematical treatment of zero, rules for manipulating positive and negative numbers, as well as algorithms for algebraic operations on decimal numbers. His work on astronomy and mathematics was transmitted to the court of the Abbasid Caliph Al-Mansur (r. 754-775 CE), who had the Indian astronomical texts translated into Arabic. Through these texts, the decimal number system spread through the Arab world and later Europe.

The Sanskrit poet Magha, the author of Sisupalavadha, lived here in 680 CE. 
The Jain scholar Siddharshi Gani, a resident of Bhinmal wrote 
Upmitibahava prapancha katha in 905 CE. The Jain Ramayana was written by Jain monk Vijayagani in 1595 CE. Jain acharya Udyotana Suri wrote Kuvalayamala here.

See also 
 Rajasthani people
 Architecture of Rajasthan
 Brahmagupta
 Hindu-Arabic numerals
 Mandore

References

 Sources
 
 
 
  
 
 
 
 
 
 

Historical Indian regions
Geography of Rajasthan
Geography of Gujarat
History of Gujarat